Paracaryum is a genus of flowering plants belonging to the family Boraginaceae.

Its native range is Egypt to Central Asia and Western Himalaya.

Species
Species:

Paracaryum bingoelianum 
Paracaryum calathicarpum 
Paracaryum crista-galli 
Paracaryum cyclhymenium 
Paracaryum cynoglossoides 
Paracaryum densum 
Paracaryum glandulosum 
Paracaryum glastifolium 
Paracaryum gracile 
Paracaryum hedgei 
Paracaryum heratense 
Paracaryum himalayense 
Paracaryum hirsutum 
Paracaryum integerrimum 
Paracaryum khorassanicum 
Paracaryum lalezarense 
Paracaryum leventshikii 
Paracaryum nigrum 
Paracaryum persicum 
Paracaryum platycalyx 
Paracaryum polyanthum 
Paracaryum ponticum 
Paracaryum pygmaeum 
Paracaryum rugulosum 
Paracaryum sintenisii 
Paracaryum strictum 
Paracaryum tenerum 
Paracaryum thomsonii 
Paracaryum turcomanicum

References

Boraginoideae
Boraginaceae genera